Décimo Bettini (30 December 1910 – 19 September 1982) was an Italian racing cyclist. He rode in the 1933 Tour de France.

References

1910 births
1982 deaths
Italian male cyclists
Place of birth missing